Shanghai East railway station is a planned new station in the Pudong New Area of Shanghai. It will be located beside Shanghai Pudong International Airport, forming a future major intermodal passenger transport hub. Shanghai East Railway Station is expected to be completed and put into operation within 2024.

Transportation 
On December 15, 2019, construction of the second phase of the Nantong–Shanghai railway from Taicang to Situan began, passing through Shanghai Pudong New Area to establish Shanghai East railway station. Shanghai East railway station will be the second largest railway station in Shanghai after Shanghai Hongqiao railway station. The Airport Link line of Shanghai Metropolitan Area Intercity Railway is under construction, connecting Shanghai East railway station with Pudong Airport, Hongqiao railway station and Hongqiao Airport.

References 

Railway stations in Shanghai
Railway stations under construction in China